Genoplesium tectum, commonly known as the Cardwell midge orchid, is a small terrestrial orchid endemic to a small area in north-eastern Queensland. It has a single thin leaf fused to the flowering stem and up to thirty light red flowers with a dark reddish-black, hairy labellum.

Description
As with others in the genus, the flowers are inverted so that the labellum is above the column rather than below it. There is a dark reddish-black callus in the centre of the labellum and extending almost to its tip. Flowering occurs from November to March.

Taxonomy and naming
Genoplesium tectum was first formally described in 1991 by David Jones and the description was published in Australian Orchid Research. In 2002, David Jones and Mark Clements changed the name to Corunastylis tecta but the change is not accepted by the Australian Plant Census. The specific epithet (tectum) is a Latin word meaning "covered", "concealed" or "secret", referring to the dense vegetation usually concealing this orchid.

Distribution and habitat
The Cardwell midge orchid grows with dense sedges and grass in woodland and is only known from an area south of Cardwell.

References

tectum
Endemic orchids of Australia
Orchids of Queensland
Plants described in 1991